I AM  She – Miss India Universe was a national beauty pageant in India that used to send its winner to Miss Universe pageant from 2010 to 2012.

History
In 2010, Femina Miss India relinquished its exclusive right to send the representative to Miss Universe, and Tantra Entertainment Private limited, in collaboration with former Miss Universe and Bollywood actress Sushmita Sen, organized the pageant in the same year.

After the 2012 Miss Universe Pageant, Sushmita Sen and Tantra entertainment announced they would be relinquishing the license for Miss Universe, but have not officially stated whether "I Am She" will continue to be held.

I AM She – Miss Universe India, sent the contestants to Miss Universe from year 2010 to 2012.

In 2013, Femina Miss India was awarded the franchise back after I AM She – Miss Universe India concluded their contract with the Miss Universe Organization. A separate pageant Miss Diva is held to send delegates from 2013 onwards.

Editions

I AM She 2010
The first ever I AM  She - Miss Universe India pageant was held on May 28 hosted by Rahul Khanna and former Femina Miss India (Miss India Universe), Neha Dhupia and was co-hosted by Ayushmann Khurrana.

The reigning Miss Universe, Stefania Fernandez crowned the very first I AM  She - Miss India Universe, Ushoshi Sengupta.

30 contestants from different parts of the country participated. After the 1st round, the top 20 contestants were announced and in the next round, the top 10 contestants. Later, from the top 5 contestants, Miss Ushoshi Sengupta emerged as the eventual winner.

I AM She 2011
The second edition of I AM  She - Miss India Universe pageant was held on 15 July 2011 in Mumbai. The winner represented India in Miss Universe 2011 held in São Paulo, Brazil.

20 contestants from different parts of the country participated. In the preliminary the contestants went through swimsuits, evening gowns and preliminary interviews. In final after the 1st round, the top 10 were  announced. Later, the top five were chosen and after the Q&A round the winner was announced

Many famous personalities from social, cultural and film fields such as Zayed Khan, Miss Asia Pacific 2000, Dia Mirza and Esha Deol attended the show.

I AM  She - Miss India Universe 2010, Ushoshi Sengupta crowned Vasuki Sunkavalli of Hyderabad as I AM She - Miss India Universe 2011 at the end of the event. The pageant was telecasted on 28 August at 7pm on Star World when Vasuki Sunkavalli was crowned I AM She - Miss Universe India 2011 by her predecessor Ushoshi Sengupta. Parul Duggal was crowned as the Miss India Globe International 2011 by I AM She 2010 - First Runner up, Reha Sukheja, whereas Tanvi Singla was crowned as Miss India Asia Pacific World  2011 by I AM She 2010 - Second Runner up, Pooja Hegde.

Parul Duggal went on to become the First Runner up at the Miss Global International 2011 in North Cyprus while Tanvi Singla went on to place fifth in Miss Asia Pacific World 2011 in Korea. Whereas Vasuki Sunkavalli remained unplaced at the Miss Universe 2011 held in São Paulo, Brazil.

I AM She 2012
The third edition for the pageant I AM She - Miss Universe was held on September 21, 2012. The finale took place in grand convention hall LICEC. Miss Universe 1994, Sushmita Sen along with Miss Asia Pacific World 2012, Himangini Singh Yadu crowned Urvashi Rautela as the new I AM She - Miss Universe India 2012 at the end of the event.

There were 20 contestants who were selected as semifinalists. The field was narrowed down to 10 and ultimately to 5.

Urvashi Rautela was to represent India at Miss Universe 2012. However, due to contradicting contracts with her being Miss Tourism Queen of the Year International and also her not being able to meet up with the age requirements of the Miss Universe Organisation as of 16 October 2012 she resigned her title. First Runner up, Shilpa Singh was crowned the new I AM She - Miss India Universe 2012.

Titleholders

Representatives at international pageants
Color key

Winners gallery

See also
 Miss Universe
 Sushmita Sen

References

External links
 I Am She - Official Website

Beauty pageants in India
Indian awards
India